The following outline is provided as an overview of and topical guide to commercial law:

Commercial law – body of law that governs business and commercial transactions. It is often considered to be a branch of civil law and deals with issues of both private law and public law. It is also called business law.

What type of thing is commercial law? 

Commercial law can be described as all of the following:

 Branch of law – law is a system of rules and guidelines which are enforced through social institutions to govern behavior, wherever possible.

Branches of commercial law 
 Companies law
 Corporate law
 Corporate governance
 Competition law (antitrust)
 Consumer protection
 Contract law
 Environmental law
 Intellectual property law
 Copyright law
 Patent law
 Trademark law
 International trade law
 Labour law
Insurance law

By region 

 European company law
 French company law
 German company law
 United Kingdom company law
 Unfair prejudice in United Kingdom company law
 Corporate law in Vietnam
 United States corporate law

Closely related areas of law 
 Legal aspects of computing
 Ecommerce Law
 Privacy law
 Property law
 Tax law

Commercial law occupations 
 Corporate lawyer

History of commercial law 

 History of companies
 History of company law in the United Kingdom
 Lex mercatoria

Business entities 

Types of business entity
Juristic person
Company (law)
Corporate law
Corporation
Incorporation (business)
Delaware corporation (U.S.)
Limited liability company
Fiduciary
Partnership
Agency
Escrow
Trustee of a trust or executor of an estate; see also trusts and estates
Charitable trust
Foundation
Association
Cooperative

Contracts 
Contract
Consideration
Duress
Warranty
Breach of contract
Remedy
Lien
 Types of contracts
Adhesion contract

Intellectual property 
Intellectual property
Agreement on Trade-Related Aspects of Intellectual Property Rights (TRIPs)
Public domain
Trade secret
Patent
Trademark
Genericized trademark
People's Republic of China's trademark law
Copyright
Fair dealing
Copyright infringement of software
List of copyright case law
 Industrial design rights

Dispute resolution 
Dispute resolution
Alternative dispute resolution
Mediation
Conciliation
Negotiation 
Arbitration
Binding arbitration

General commercial law concepts 

 Employment
Sexual harassment
Non-disclosure agreement
Bankruptcy
Blue law
Civil law notary 
Class action
Cyber law
Online Copyright Infringement Liability Limitation Act
 estoppel
 Financial regulation
 Fraud deterrence
 International trade law
 Law and economics
 Land use
 Letter of credit
 Malpractice
 Notary public
 Negotiable instruments
 Property law
 Real property
 Security interest
 Mechanics lien
Product liability
Negligence
Proximate cause
Mandatory labelling
Racketeer Influenced and Corrupt Organizations Act
Release
Torts
Uniform Commercial Code
Lex mercatoria

Commercial law organizations 
 International Technology Law Association
 Student Intellectual Property Law Association
 American Law and Economics Association

Commercial law publications 

 Columbia Business Law Review
 Currents
 European Business Law Review
 Florida State University Business Review
 Law and Business Review of the Americas

See also 

 Outline of law
 Outline of business management
 Outline of marketing
 Outline of economics
 Principles of International Commercial Contracts
 Outline of production
 List of international trade topics
 List of accounting topics
 List of business theorists
 List of economists
 Sales tax
Legal lexicography
Law dictionary

References

External links 

law topics
Business law topics
 
Commercial law
Commercial law